Trechus zarandicus is a species of ground beetle in the subfamily Trechinae. It was described by P. Moravec in 1986.

References

zarandicus
Beetles described in 1986